Acacia nigripilosa is a shrub belonging to the genus Acacia and the subgenus Phyllodineae that is endemic to Western Australia.

Description
It has glabrous ash-grey, coloured branchlets. the ascending to erect dull to shiny green phyllodes have a linear to narrowly oblong-elliptic or oblanceolate shape. It blooms from July to September and produces yellow flowers. The flower-heads have a slightly obloid shape and contain 18 to 34 golden flowers.

Taxonomy
The species was first formally described by the botanist Joseph Maiden in 1920 as part of the work Notes on Acacias, No. IV, with descriptions of new species as published in the Journal and Proceedings of the Royal Society of New South Wales. It was reclassified in 2003 as Racosperma nigripilosum by Leslie Pedley then transferred back to the genus Acacia in 2006. The only other synonym for this species is Acacia nigripilosus.  
There are two recognized subspecies:
 Acacia nigripilosa subsp. latifolia
 Acacia nigripilosa subsp. nigripilosa

Distribution
It is native to an area in the Mid West, Goldfields and Wheatbelt regions of Western Australia where it grows in sandy soils around laterite. It is found as far north as around Yuna south to around Goomalling and east out to Mount Holland where it is found in scrubland or open woodland communities.

See also
 List of Acacia species

References

nigripilosa
Acacias of Western Australia
Plants described in 1920
Taxa named by Joseph Maiden